Oskar Gross (1871 - 1963) was an artist in Germany and the United States. Born in Vienna, he worked in Munich before moving to the United States. His work included decorative murals in buildings for Daniel Burnham, Louis Sullivan and George C. Nimmons He was also a portraitist.

He was born in Vienna in 1871. He won a competition in 1898 to paint murals for the Austro-Hungarian state pavilions at the World’s Fair in Paris. This led to an offer to work in Chicago.

He did paintings for Sullivan's National Farmers Bank in Owatonna, Minnesota. He did interior paintings for Chicago's Franklin Building.

He returned to portrait painting after 1920. His work includes a portrait of Dankmar Adler displayed in the lobby of Roosevelt University.

He died in Chicago in 1963.

References

1871 births
1963 deaths
Austro-Hungarian emigrants to the United States
Austrian male artists
Austrian portrait painters
Austro-Hungarian expatriates in Germany